The 2019–20 Duquesne Dukes men's basketball team represented Duquesne University during the 2019–20 NCAA Division I men's basketball season. The Dukes, led by third-year head coach Keith Dambrot, were members of the Atlantic 10 Conference. The Dukes finished the season 21–9, 11–7 in A-10 play to finish in a tie for fifth place. Their season ended when the A-10 tournament and all other postseason tournament were canceled due to the ongoing coronavirus pandemic.

Due to the closure of the Dukes' normal home of UPMC Cooper Fieldhouse (formerly Palumbo Center) for major renovations, the team used three venues for its home games—Kerr Fitness Center at La Roche University in the northern suburb of McCandless, UPMC Events Center at Robert Morris University in the northwest suburb of Moon Township, and PPG Paints Arena in downtown Pittsburgh.

Previous season
The Dukes finished the 2018–19 season 19–13, 7–11 in A-10 play to finish in a tie for sixth place. As the No. 7 seed in the A-10 tournament, they lost to Saint Joseph's in the second round.

Offseason

Departures

Incoming transfers

2019 recruiting class

Roster

Schedule and results

|-
!colspan=9 style=| Exhibition

|-
!colspan=9 style=| Non-conference regular season

|-
!colspan=9 style=|Atlantic 10 regular season

|-
!colspan=9 style=|Atlantic 10 tournament

Source

References

Duquesne
Duquesne Dukes men's basketball seasons
Duquesne
Duquesne